The Masaka Inland Container Depot (MICD), is a dry port, in Kigali, the capital city and largest city of Rwanda.

Location

Overview
In January 2016, the government of Rwanda signed an agreement with Dubai Ports World (DPW) to construct what is officially referred to as the Kigali Logistics Platform (KLP). DPW would then manage and operate the dry depot for 25 years from the date of completion.

Onsite services include customs inspection and clearance services, revenue service, maintenance and repair facilities, banking facilities and IT facilities.

The dry port will provide for loading and unloading from transport trucks, warehousing, and cold storage. Imports from overseas can also be distributed through the logistics chain to neighboring, Goma and Bukavu cities in D.R Congo's North and South Kivu provinces. The facility is linked to the Port of Dar es Salaam the main entrance point for the Central Corridor.

Construction

The cost of both phases is budgeted at US$80 million.

Ownership
MICD is under development by Dubai Ports World, an international maritime facilities developer and manager, with over 70 terminals across the world, with over 35,000 employees. DPW will own and manage the facility for 25 years from date of commissioning.

See also
 Isaka-Kigali Standard Gauge Railway
 Rwanda Standard Gauge Railway

References

External links
 Kigali cargo hub plans face hurdles As of 7 July 2018.

Ports and harbours of Rwanda
Buildings and structures in Kigali
Transport in Rwanda